The Bank of England Act 1696 (8 & 9 Will 3 c 20) was an Act of the Parliament of England. It was one of the Bank of England Acts 1694 to 1892.

Provisoes or conditions contained in this Act, and in the Bank of England Act 1694 (5 W & M c 20), for determining a fund of £100,000 per annum, and the corporation of the governor and company of the Bank of England, upon the respective notices and payments in both Acts mentioned, were repealed and made void by section 8 of the Bank of England Act 1708 (7 Ann c 30) (which is section 5 of chapter 7 in Ruffhead's Edition).

Sections 1 to 25, 29, 38 to 44, 50, 51, 53 to 61, 63 to 68, 70 and 71 were repealed by section 1 of, and the Schedule to, the Statute Law Revision Act 1867.

The whole Act was repealed by section 1(1) of, and Part IV of Schedule 1 to, the Statute Law (Repeals) Act 1973.

Section 36
So much of this Act as related to forging or counterfeiting the Common Seal of the Governor and Company of the Bank of England, or any sealed bank bill, or any bank note, or altering or raising any indorsement on any bank bill or note was repealed as to England on 21 July 1830 by section 31 of the Forgery Act 1830. The marginal note to that section says that the effect of this was to repeal section 36.

Section 62
This section was repealed by section 1 of, and the Schedule to, the Statute Law Revision Act 1871.

Section 69
This section was repealed by section 1 of, and the Schedule to, the Statute Law Revision Act 1871.

References
Halsbury's Statutes,
Chronological Table and Index of the Statutes. Fourth Edition. Queen's Printers. London. 1878. Page 69.

Further reading

  Text of the original Act

Acts of the Parliament of England
1696 in England
1696 in law
Bank of England
Repealed English legislation
1696 in economics
Banking legislation in the United Kingdom